Gerhardus (Gerard) Diephuis (6 February 1817, Farmsum – 4 November 1892, Groningen) was a Dutch jurist.

After studies in Groningen, he was a judge with the  arrondissement court in Winschoten and later with a higher court in Groningen. In 1840 he married Alagonda Geertruida Hemmes, with whom he had ten children. In 1859 he became a full professor at the university of Groningen. During the period  1864–1865 he was the rector magnificus of this institution.

Diephuis was a leading proponent of legism and of the primacy of legislation. Influenced by French teachings, he wrote numerous textbooks on Dutch civil law. He was also instrumental in further diminishing the influence of Roman and customary law in favour of codified legislation.

References
 

1817 births
1892 deaths
Dutch jurists
Rectors of universities in the Netherlands
University of Groningen alumni
Academic staff of the University of Groningen
People from Delfzijl
19th-century Dutch people